Dolenja Vas pri Črnomlju is a settlement on the left bank of the Lahinja River, immediately east of the town of Črnomelj in the White Carniola area of southeastern Slovenia. The area is part of the traditional region of Lower Carniola and is now included in the Southeast Slovenia Statistical Region.

Name
The name of the settlement was changed from Dolenja vas to Dolenja vas pri Črnomlju in 1955.

References

External links
Dolenja Vas pri Črnomlju on Geopedia

Populated places in the Municipality of Črnomelj